Thomas Troy Handy (March 11, 1892 – April 12, 1982) was a United States Army four-star general who served as Deputy Chief of Staff, United States Army from 1944 to 1947; Commanding General, Fourth United States Army from 1947 to 1949; Commander in Chief, United States European Command from 1949 to 1952; Commander in Chief, United States Army Europe/Commander, Central Army Group in 1952; and Deputy Commander in Chief, United States European Command from 1952 to 1954.

Biography
Handy was born on March 11, 1892, in Spring City, Tennessee, and attended the Virginia Military Institute, graduating in 1914. He did not receive an army commission until two years later, in the Field Artillery. Handy deployed with the 5th Field Artillery Regiment to France in August 1917, moving to the 42nd Infantry Division in 1918. On February 26, 1918, he accompanied Douglas MacArthur on a trench raid. Later that year was assigned to the 151st Field Artillery Regiment. Following World War I and occupation duty in Germany he went to Fort Sill, Oklahoma.

Handy returned to his alma mater in 1921, serving as an instructor until 1925. After graduating from the Command and General Staff School at Fort Leavenworth, Kansas, he assumed duties as Executive Officer of the 3rd Field Artillery Brigade in 1928. He served in various staff assignments from 1929 to 1931 in Panama, then returned to Fort Sill as an instructor at the United States Army Field Artillery School until 1934. His time there was followed as a student at the United States Army War College, and after graduating in 1935 he went to the Naval War College. His schooling was followed by assignment to the General Staff until 1940, interrupted for a year by taking command of the 78th Field Artillery Battalion at Fort Benning. 

In December 1941 Handy was promoted to temporary brigadier general, and temporary major general in June 1942 when he became Assistant Chief-of-Staff in charge of Operations Division, succeeding Dwight Eisenhower. In September 1944 he was promoted to temporary lieutenant general. In October 1944 he became Deputy Chief-of-Staff of the Army, receiving his fourth star in March 1945. In August 1945 he was acting Chief-of-Staff, due to George C. Marshall's absence, and transmitted the order for use of the atomic bomb.

Following the war, Handy remained Deputy Chief of Staff, and in September 1947 he assumed command of Fourth United States Army at Fort Sam Houston, Texas. Two years later, in September 1949, he was Lucius D. Clay's successor as Commander-in-Chief of United States European Command. He moved down to Deputy Supreme Commander in 1952 when Matthew Ridgway was named Supreme Allied Commander, Allied Powers. Handy retired from the army in 1954 to Washington, D.C., later residing in San Antonio, Texas.

Handy died on April 12, 1982, and was buried in Arlington National Cemetery next to his wife, Alma Hudson Handy (1890–1970).

Awards and decorations
Handy's awards and decorations included the Distinguished Service Cross, Army Distinguished Service Medal with two oak leaf clusters, Legion of Merit, National Defense Service Medal, Croix de Guerre (France), the Commander of the Legion of Honor (France), the Croix de Guerre with Palm (Belgium), Honorary Knight Commander of the Order of the British Empire (United Kingdom), Grand Officer of the Order of Leopold (Belgium), Grand Cordon of the Order of Cloud and Banner (Yun Hui) (China), the Order of Abdon Calderon 1st Class (Ecuador), and the Distinguished Civilian Service Medal.

References

External links
Generals of World War II

1892 births
1982 deaths
United States Army Field Artillery Branch personnel
Military personnel from Tennessee
People from Spring City, Tennessee
Recipients of the Distinguished Service Cross (United States)
Recipients of the Distinguished Service Medal (US Army)
Recipients of the Legion of Merit
Recipients of the Legion of Honour
Recipients of the Croix de Guerre (France)
United States Army personnel of World War I
Burials at Arlington National Cemetery
Virginia Military Institute alumni
United States Army Command and General Staff College alumni
United States Army War College alumni
United States Army generals of World War II
United States Army generals
Naval War College alumni